Mo Youxue (born February 10, 1996) is a Chinese track and field sprint athlete who competes in the 100m and 200-meter dash events. He won a silver medal for China in the 4 x 100 metres relay at the 2015 World Championships in Beijing.

Mo was born in Bantang Hamlet 板塘屯, Bantang Village 板塘村, Chuanshan Town 穿山镇, Liujiang County, Liuzhou City, Guangxi Province, China.

His first major result was a gold medal at the 2013 World Youth Championships, where he ran a personal best and world youth leading time of 10.35, beating Ojie Edoburun in a photo finish.

He won a silver medal for China in the 4 x 100 metres relay at the 2015 World Championships in Beijing finishing behind Jamaica.

Personal bests
100 metres: 10.346 seconds (2013)
200 metres: 20.96 seconds (2015)

References

Living people
1996 births
Chinese male sprinters
World Athletics Championships athletes for China
World Athletics Championships medalists
Asian Games medalists in athletics (track and field)
Asian Games gold medalists for China
Medalists at the 2014 Asian Games
Athletes (track and field) at the 2014 Asian Games
People from Liuzhou
Runners from Guangxi